Raphael Andergassen (born June 16, 1993) is an Italian ice hockey player for HC Pustertal Wölfe in the ICE Hockey League (ICEHL) and the Italian national team.

He participated at the 2017 IIHF World Championship.

References

External links

1993 births
Living people
Italian ice hockey forwards
Ice hockey people from Bolzano
HC Pustertal Wölfe players
Germanophone Italian people
Ritten Sport players